Niederfüllbach is a municipality in the district of Coburg in Bavaria in Germany.

Gallery

See also

References

Coburg (district)